Eren Erdoğan (born 22 May 2001) is a Turkish professional footballer who plays as a winger for Altay.

Career
A youth product of Altay, Erdoğan began his senior career with them in 2019 before going on loan with Fethiyespor. He made his professional debut for Altay in a 2–0 Süper Lig loss to Fenerbahçe on 29 August 2021.

References

External links
 

2001 births
Living people
Sportspeople from İzmir
Turkish footballers
Association football wingers
Altay S.K. footballers
Fethiyespor footballers
Süper Lig players
TFF First League players